Chloroclystis speciosa is a moth in the family Geometridae. It was described by Charles Swinhoe in 1902. It is endemic to New Guinea.

References

External links

Moths described in 1902
speciosa
Endemic fauna of New Guinea
Taxa named by Charles Swinhoe